Over the years, London Underground has acquired various types of engineering stock to help with the construction of new lines and maintenance of existing lines. Some of these wagons were inherited from its predecessors, many were built new and some were acquired second-hand from the main-line railways. Several types of specialist wagons have been used, which are described below.

Overview 
London Underground uses a numbering system comprising the wagon number prefixed with a letter which designates the wagon's type. These are summarised below.

Brake vans 

London Underground has used various designs of brake van. They were used for the guard's accommodation and for braking purposes (when wagons in the train were not fitted with automatic brakes).

Two brake vans of interest were numbers FB578 and FB579. These were 'flat' brake vans, converted from flat wagons. The conversion consisted of building a small guard's compartment on one end of the flat wagon. Therefore, these wagons could be used for carrying small items, such as sleepers, in addition to their role as a brake van.

Six brake vans numbered B580–5 were built for London Transport by British Railways (BR) at the latter's Ashford Works in the early 1960s. They were built to a design which had been produced for BR since 1950 (BR Diagram 1/506 and 1/507), totalling  units, and were the final examples of that design to be constructed.

Stock list 

All data from London Underground Rolling Stock, 1st through 15th editions.

Preserved units

Gallery

References

External links 

Engineering stock